Chalcides armitagei, also known commonly as Armitage's cylindrical skink, is a species of lizard in the family Scincidae. The species is endemic to West Africa.

Etymology
The specific name, armitagei, is in honor of Cecil Hamilton Armitage (1869-1933), who collected the type specimen while he was Governor of the Gambia.

Geographic range
C. armitagei is found in Gambia, Guinea-Bissau, and Senegal.

Habitat
The preferred natural habitat of C. armitagei is vegetated coastal dunes, where it can be found under leaf litter. It has also been found in artificial plantations.

Reproduction
C. armitagei is viviparous.

Note
There have been several errors in the scientific literature concerning C. armitagei. For the year of description, Frank & Ramus (1995) give 1896, while Pasteur (1981) gives 1920 and 1921. Also, the original describer, Edward George Boulenger, has been confused with his father, George Albert Boulenger.

References

Further reading
Boulenger EG (1922). "Description of a New Lizard of the genus Chalcides, from the Gambia, living in the Society's Gardens". Proceedings of the Zoological Society of London 1922: 899. (Chalcides armitagei, new species).

Skinks of Africa
Reptiles of West Africa
Reptiles described in 1922
armitagei